Burgas Province (formerly the Burgas okrug) is a province in southeastern Bulgaria, including the southern Bulgarian Black Sea Coast. The province is named after its administrative and industrial centre, the city of Burgas, the fourth biggest town in the country. It is the largest province by area, embracing a territory of  that is divided into 13 municipalities with a total population, as of December 2009, of 422,319 inhabitants.

Municipalities

Burgas Province (област, oblast) contains 13 municipalities. The following table shows the names of each municipality in English and Cyrillic, the main town or village (towns are shown in bold), and the population of each as of 2009.

Demographics

The following table represents the change of the population in the province after World War II:

Ethnic groups

Total population (2011 census): 415,817
Ethnic groups (2011 census):
Identified themselves: 370 544 persons:
Bulgarians: 298 128 (80,46%)
Turks: 49 354 (13,32%)
Romani: 18 424 (4,97%)
Others and indefinable: 4 638 (1,25%)
A further 45,000 persons in Burgas Province did not declare their ethnic group at the 2011 census.

Ethnic groups according to the 2001 census, when 423 547 people of the population of 423,608 of Burgas Province identified themselves (with percentage of total population):
Bulgarians: 338 625
Turks: 58 636
Romani: 19 439
Russians: 1 107
Armenians: 904
Vlachs (Aromanians, Romanians, Romanian-speaking Boyash): 623
Ukrainians: 185
Greeks: 125

Religion
Religious adherence in the province according to 2001 census:

Towns and villages 
The place names in bold have the status of town. Other localities have the status of village.

Aytos Municipality 
Aytos,
Cherna Mogila,
Chernograd,
Chukarka,
Dryankovets,
Karageorgievo,
Karanovo,
Lyaskovo,
Malka Polyana,
Maglen,
Peshtersko,
Pirne,
Polyanovo,
Raklinovo,
Sadievo,
Topolitsa,
Zetyovo

Burgas Municipality 
Balgarovo,
Banevo,
Bratovo,
Bryastovets,
Burgas,
Cherno More,
Dimchevo,
Draganovo,
Izvorishte,
Marinka,
Mirolyubovo,
Ravnets,
Rudnik,
Tvarditsa,
Vetren

Kameno Municipality 
Kameno,
Krastina,
Livada,
Konstantinovo,
Polski Izvor,
Rusokastro,
Svoboda,
Troyanovo,
Trastikovo,
Cherni Vrah
Vinarsko,
Vratitsa,
Zhelyazovo

Karnobat Municipality 
Asparuhovo,
Cherkovo,
Detelina,
Devetak,
Devetintsi,
Dobrinovo,
Dragantsi,
Dragovo,
Ekzarh Antimovo,
Glumche,
Hadzhiite,
Iskra,
Karnobat,
Klikach,
Kozare,
Krumovo Gradishte,
Krushovo,
Madrino,
Nevestino,
Ognen,
Raklitsa,
San-Stefano,
Sigmen,
Sokolovo,
Sarnevo,
Smolnik,
Tserkovski,
Venets,
Zheleznik,
Zhitosvyat,
Zimen

Malko Tarnovo Municipality 
Bliznak,
Brashlyan,
Byala voda,
Evrenozovo,
Gramatikovo,
Kalovo,
Malko Tarnovo,
Mladezhko,
Slivarovo,
Stoilovo
Vizitsa,
Zabernovo,
Zvezdets

Nesebar Municipality 
Banya,
Emona,
Gyulyovtsa,
Koznitsa,
Kosharitsa,
Nesebar,
Obzor,
Orizare,
Panitsovo,
Priseltsi,
Rakovskovo,
Ravda,
Sunny beach,
Sveti Vlas,
Tankovo

Pomorie Municipality 
Aheloy,
Belodol,
Aleksandrovo,
Bata,
Dabnik,
Gaberovo,
Goritsa,
Galabets,
Kableshkovo,
Kamenar,
Kozichino,
Kosovets,
Laka,
Medovo,
Pomorie,
Poroy,
Stratsin

Primorsko Municipality 
Kiten, 
Novo Panicharevo, 
Pismenovo, 
Primorsko, 
Veselie, 
Yasna polyana,

Ruen Municipality 
Bilka,
Cheresha,
Dobra polyana,
Dobromir,
Dropla,
Daskotna,
Dyulya,
Kamenyak,
Karavelyovo,
Listets,
Lyulyakovo,
Pripek,
Mrezhichko,
Podgorets,
Preobrazhentsi,
Planinitsa,
Prosenik,
Rechitsa,
Razboyna,
Razhitsa,
Rozhden,
Rudina,
Ruen,
Rupcha,
Shivarovo,
Skalak,
Snezha,
Snyagovo,
Sokolets,
Sredna Mahala,
Struya,
Sini Rid,
Topchiysko,
Tranak,
Vishna,
Vresovo,
Yabalchevo,
Yasenovo,
Zaimchevo,
Zaychar,
Zvezda

Sozopol Municipality 
Atia,
Chernomorets,
Gabar,
Indzhe voyvoda,
Izvor,
Krushevets,
Prisad,
Ravadinovo,
Ravna gora,
Rosen,
Sozopol,
Varshilo,
Zidarovo

Sredets Municipality 
Belevren,
Belila,
Bistrets,
Bogdanovo,
Debelt,
Dolno Yabalkovo,
Draka,
Drachevo,
Dyulevo,
Fakiya,
Golyamo Bukovo,
Gorno Yabalkovo,
Granitets,
Granichar,
Sredets,
Kirovo,
Kubadin,
Momina Tsarkva,
Malina,
Orlintsi,
Prohod,
Panchevo,
Radoynovo,
Rosenovo,
Svetlina,
Sinyo Kamene,
Slivovo,
Suhodol,
Trakiytsi,
Varovnik,
Zagortsi,
Zornitsa,

Sungurlare Municipality 
Balabanchevo,
Beronovo,
Bosilkovo,
Chernitsa,
Chubra,
Dabovitsa
Gorovo,
Esen,
Grozden,
Kamensko,
Kamchiya,
Klimash,
Kosten,
Lozarevo,
Lozitsa,
Manolich,
Pchelin,
Podvis,
Prilep,
Sadovo,
Skala,
Slavyantsi,
Sungurlare,
Terziysko,
Valchin,
Vedrovo,
Velislav,
Vezenkovo,
Zavet

Tsarevo Municipality 
Ahtopol,
Brodilovo,
Balgari,
Fazanovo,
Izgrev,
Kondolovo,
Kosti,
Lozenets,
Rezovo,
Sinemorets,
Tsarevo,
Varvara,
Velika

See also
Provinces of Bulgaria
Municipalities of Bulgaria
List of cities and towns in Bulgaria
List of villages in Burgas Province

References

External links
Burgas Municipality official website
Burgas Province - Municipalities, postal and phone codes, population, maps, hotels
Port of Burgas
Region of Burgas
News from Burgas

 
Provinces of Bulgaria